Cupedora tomsetti is a species of air-breathing land snail, a terrestrial pulmonate gastropod mollusk in the family Camaenidae.
This species is endemic to Australia.

References 

Gastropods of Australia
tomsetti
Gastropods described in 1887
Taxonomy articles created by Polbot